Stay Forever may refer to:

"Stay Forever" (Hal Ketchum song)
"Stay Forever" (Platin song)
"Stay Forever", a song by Delain from April Rain
"Stay Forever", single by Joey Lawrence from Joey Lawrence (1993)
"Stay Forever", single by Ween from White Pepper'' (2000)
"Stay Forever", song by Proud Mary (2001)